Amnicola is a genus of very small freshwater snails which have an operculum. Amnicola species are aquatic prosobranch gastropod mollusks in the family Amnicolidae according to the taxonomy of the Gastropoda (Bouchet & Rocroi, 2005).

Amnicola is the type genus of the family Amnicolidae.

Species
Species in the genus Amnicola include:
 Amnicola aldrichi (Call & Beecher, 1886) - Hoosier amnicola
 Amnicola aldrichi antroecetes 
 Amnicola bakerianus Pilsbry, 1917    
 Amnicola browni Carpenter, 1872 - slender duskysnail   
 Amnicola clarki Pilsbry, 1917    
 Amnicola cora Hubricht, 1979 - Foushee cavesnail   
 Amnicola dalli Call, 1884 - peninsula amnicola
 Amnicola decisus Haldeman, 1845      
 Amnicola granum (Say, 1822) - squat duskysnail   
 Amnicola greggi Pilsbry, 1935 - Rocky Mountain duskysnail   
 Amnicola integra Say, 1821    
 Amnicola limosus (Say, 1817) - mud amnicola   
 Amnicola missouriensis Pilsbry, 1898 - Missouri amnicola   
 Amnicola pallida Haldeman, 1842    
 Amnicola pilsbry Walker, 1906 - lake duskysnail   
 Amnicola proserpina Hubricht, 1940 - Proserpine cavesnail   
 Amnicola pupoideus (Gould, 1841) - pupa duskysnail   
 Amnicola retromargo F. G. Thompson, 1968 - indented duskysnail   
 Amnicola rhombostoma F. G. Thompson, 1968 - squaremouth amnicola   
 Amnicola stygius Hubricht, 1971 - stygian amnicola   
 Amnicola walkeri Pilsbry, 1898 - Canadian duskysnail   
 Amnicola winkleyi Pilsbry, 1912
Species brought  into synonymy
 Amnicola cisternina Walker, 1919: synonym of Aroapyrgus cisterninus (Walker, 1919)
 Amnicola comalensis Pilsbry & Ferriss, 1906: synonym of Marstonia comalensis (Pilsbry & Ferriss, 1906)
 Amnicola conchensensis Walker, 1919: synonym of Aroapyrgus conchensensis (Walker, 1919)
 Amnicola crosseana Pilsbry, 1910: synonym of Littoridina crosseana (Pilsbry, 1910)
 Amnicola emarginata (Küster, 1852): synonym of Probythinella emarginata (Kuster, 1852)
 Amnicola floridana Frauenfeld, 1863: synonym of Floridobia floridana (Frauenfeld, 1863)
 Amnicola guatemalensis P. Fischer & Crosse, 1891: synonym of Aroapyrgus guatemalensis (P. Fischer & Crosse, 1891)
 Amnicola hinkleyi Walker, 1919: synonym of Aroapyrgus hinkleyi  (Walker, 1919)
 Amnicola lustrica Pilsbry, 1890: synonym of Marstonia lustrica (Pilsbry, 1890)
 Amnicola micrococcus Pilsbry, 1893: synonym of Pyrgulopsis micrococcus (Pilsbry, 1893)
 Amnicola orcutti Pilsbry, 1928: synonym of Littoridina orcutti (Pilsbry, 1928)
 Amnicola orizabensis (Crosse & P. Fischer, 1891): synonym of Aroapyrgus orizabensis (Crosse & P. Fischer, 1891)
 Amnicola panamensis Tryon, 1863: synonym of Aroapyrgus panamensis (Tryon, 1863)
 Amnicola panzosensis Walker, 1919: synonym of Aroapyrgus panzosensis (Walker, 1919)
 Amnicola pasionensis Goodrich & Van der Schalie, 1937: synonym of Aroapyrgus pasionensis (Goodrich & Van der Schalie, 1937)
 Amnicola rowelli Tryon, 1863: synonym of Cochliopa rowelli (Tryon, 1863)
 Amnicola sayana Haldeman, 1841: synonym of Pomatiopsis cincinnatiensis (I. Lea, 1840)
 Amnicola seminula Frauenfeld, 1863: synonym of Radomaniola seminula (Frauenfeld, 1863)
 Amnicola spirata Paladilhe, 1869: synonym of Pseudamnicola subproducta (Paladilhe, 1869)
 Amnicola stolli Martens, 1901: synonym of Aroapyrgus stolli (Martens, 1901)
 Amnicola subangulata Martens, 1899: synonym of Aroapyrgus subangulatus (Martens, 1899)
 Amnicola subproducta Paladilhe, 1869: synonym of Pseudamnicola subproducta (Paladilhe, 1869)
 Amnicola tenuipes Couper, 1844: synonym of Littoridinops tenuipes (Couper, 1844)
 Amnicola tryoni Pilsbry, 1904: synonym of Aroapyrgus tryoni (Pilsbry, 1904)

References

External links 
 

 
Amnicolidae
Taxa named by Augustus Addison Gould
Taxa named by Samuel Stehman Haldeman
Taxonomy articles created by Polbot